Aygulevo (Aygöl) is a rural locality (a selo) and the administrative centre of Aygulevsky Selsoviet, Sterlitamaksky District, Bashkortostan, Russia. The population was 641 as of 2010. There are 5 streets.

Geography 
Pomryaskino is the nearest rural locality.

References 

Rural localities in Sterlitamaksky District